The anti-missionary riot in Wuhu, Anhui, China occurred in May 1891, against Roman Catholic mission.

Background
People grow suspicious as two Chinese nuns walking the streets, anointing the holy water on children, they began to harasses the nuns and took them to the police. The nuns were returned to the Roman Catholic mission. People were not satisfied and called for a riot against the Roman Catholic mission.

Event
The following day, a crowd gathered at the church. Directed by men in respectable attire, they torn down the walls, ransack the building and dug out graves, in search of murdered children, and money.

Aftermath
A French gunboat arrived on the third day, followed by a British gunboat. The riot quelled, without death on both sides.

See also
Anti-missionary riots in China

References

History of Anhui
1891 in China
Wuhu
Christianity in Anhui
Catholic Church in China
1891 riots
1891 in Christianity